Tingha is a small town on the Northern Tablelands, New South Wales, Australia in Inverell Shire. Formerly part of Armidale Region, on 1 July 2019, responsibility for Tingha was transferred from Armidale Regional Council to Inverell Shire Council. Tingha is an Aboriginal word for "flat or level".

History
Before non indigenous settlement the area now known as Tingha was mainly lived upon by people from the Nucoorilma clan of the Gamilaroi Nation, which is an associated group of the Murri Aboriginal people. Many of their descendants still live in the surrounding area.

Tingha was first settled in 1841 by Sydney Hudson Darby and became a mining town after tin was discovered there in the 1870s.  Within a year Australia's first commercial tin mines were operating at a private settlement known as Armidale Crossing. Around 5,000 people arrived and about 1000 of the miners were Chinese. The Wing Hing Long Museum is a reminder of that heritage, being established in the 1880s as a general store by Chinese storekeeper, Ah Lin. Armidale Crossing Post Office opened on 1 September 1872 and was renamed Tingha the next month.

The village was proclaimed a town in 1885. Initially there were enough readily accessible surface deposits to make a good living without using machinery as Chinese people did. The first school was established by the Sisters of St. Joseph in 1890. In the 1890s drought came to the district and the easily obtained deposits of tin were exhausted leading to a loss in population.

By the early 1900s the mining boom was over and Tingha's population had dwindled to just a few hundred people. Shortly after this, large companies moved into the area to mine the less accessible tin.

The town was serviced by the Bundarra & Tingha Advocate newspaper, published in Bundarra, from 1900 to 1932.  It was also serviced by the Tingha Advocate and North-Western Journal, published in Tingha, from 1916 to 1932.

Formerly part of the Guyra Shire and then the Armidale Region, on 1 July 2019, responsibility for Tingha was transferred from Armidale Regional Council to Inverell Shire Council.

Heritage listings 
Tingha has a number of heritage-listed sites, including:
 10 Ruby Street: Wing Hing Long & Co. Store

Today
The main industry nowadays is agriculture with some fossicking in the area. Tin dredging and mining has continued on a scale that varies according to international price fluctuations.

Tingha has a hospital, pre-school, primary school, caravan park, sports and recreation club, a first aid post, hotels plus other shops and services to supply daily needs. Tingha Tigers rugby league club have a large following and have produced several National Rugby League players. Tingha's "swimming hole" is a large man made pool which was once a mining excavation. One of the main attractions around Tingha is "Green Valley Farm" Entertainment Park. In 2018, the town's residents voted for the town to become a part of Inverell Shire Council area.

In February 2019 a bushfire that commenced by a lightning strike burnt  and destroyed 13 homes and 44 outbuildings. A further six homes and 13 outbuildings were also damaged by the fire.

Notable people
 Nathan Blacklocka former Kangaroo, St George Illawarra Dragons, and Hull F.C. rugby league and Waratahs rugby union player
 Preston Campbella former Gold Coast Titans, Cronulla Sharks, Penrith Panthers, and Gold Coast Chargers rugby league player
 Owen Craigiea former Newcastle Knights, Wests Tigers, South Sydney Rabbitohs, and Widnes rugby league player
 Bevan Frencha former Parramatta Eels rugby league player who played junior rugby league for the Tingha Tigers
 Chris Lewis a Melbourne Storm rugby league player who played junior rugby league for the Ashford Roosters

References

External links

 Tingha in the Sydney Morning Herald Travel

 
Mining towns in New South Wales
Towns in New England (New South Wales)
Inverell Shire